("Little Brabant") is a Flemish region in the Belgian province of Antwerp. It includes the municipalities of Bornem and Puurs-Sint-Amands. The region is also a police zone, named .

The region got a lot of attention during and after the broadcasting of the Eén series . The yearly  and the  also contribute to the image of the region.

Geography of Antwerp Province
Regions of Flanders
Areas of Belgium